Blues with a Feeling: The Very Best of Taj Mahal is an album by American blues artist Taj Mahal.

Track listing
 "Señor Blues"
 "Don't Call Us"
 "(You've Got to) Love Her with a Feeling"
 "Lovin' in My Baby's Eyes"
 "Betty and Dupree"
 "Here in the Dark"
 "That's How Strong My Love Is"
 "Lonely Avenue"
 "Mockingbird"
 "Mailbox Blues"
 "Think"
 "Sitting on Top of the World"
 "Mind Your Own Business"
 "Cakewalk Into Town"
 "Blues with a Feeling"
 "Take a Giant Step"
 "The New Hula Blues"
 "The Hustle Is On"
 "Let the Four Winds Blow"
 "Blue Light Boogie"

References

2003 greatest hits albums
Taj Mahal (musician) compilation albums